Prodigal Transmission is the debut album by the Christian metal band Wrench in the Works.  The album was released in 2005 by Redscroll Records.

Track listing 
"Paleface"
"Tonight Is War"
"Catepillar"
"Bitten by Flies"
"Psalm 151"
"Wires of Resentment"
"Woven"
"Streets Paved of Gold"

References

External links 
Official Myspace
Jesus Freak Hideout

2005 albums
Wrench in the Works albums